Chow Man-kong is a Hong Kong economist and politician. He was elected as a member of Legislative Council for the Election Committee constituency heavily skewed the pro-Beijing camp.

Born in colonial Hong Kong, Chow had held positions in pro-Beijing organisations. Chow was the special advisor to the Central Policy Unit of the Hong Kong Government and a member of the Hebei provincial committee of Chinese People's Political Consultative Conference. He ran in the 2021 Legislative Council election and was elected through the Election Committee constituency.

On 5 January 2022, Carrie Lam announced new warnings and restrictions against social gathering due to potential COVID-19 outbreaks. One day later, it was discovered that Chow attended a birthday party hosted by Witman Hung Wai-man, with 222 guests. At least one guest tested positive with COVID-19, causing many guests to be quarantined.

In September 2022, Chow tested positive for COVID-19.

References 

Living people
HK LegCo Members 2022–2025
Members of the Election Committee of Hong Kong, 2021–2026
1981 births